Acus is a genus of achilid planthoppers in the family Achilidae. There is at least one described species in Acus, A. acutulus.

See also 
 List of Achilidae genera

References

Further reading

 
 
 
 
 

Achilidae
Auchenorrhyncha genera